A Woman of No Importance is a 1937 French drama film directed by Jean Choux and starring Pierre Blanchar, Lisette Lanvin and Marguerite Templey. It is an adaptation of the 1893 play A Woman of No Importance by Oscar Wilde.

The film's sets were designed by the art director Jacques Krauss. The film was made by the French subsidiary of Tobis Film, which had made a German adaption of the story the previous year.

Main cast
 Pierre Blanchar as Lord Illingworth  
 Lisette Lanvin as Hester  
 Marguerite Templey as Lady Hustanton  
 Gilbert Gil as Gerald  
 Catherine Fonteney as Lady Patricia  
 Charles Granval as Le pasteur  
 Jean Périer as Lord Illingworth père  
 Laure Diana as Caroline 
 Line Noro as Sylvia  
 Jean Tissier as Lord Hustanton

References

Bibliography 
 Maurice Bessy & Raymond Chirat. Histoire du cinéma français: 1935-1939. Pygmalion, 1987.
 Rège, Philippe. Encyclopedia of French Film Directors, Volume 1. Scarecrow Press, 2009.

External links 
 

1937 films
French drama films
1937 drama films
1930s French-language films
Films directed by Jean Choux
Films set in London
French films based on plays
Films based on works by Oscar Wilde
Tobis Film films
French black-and-white films
1930s French films